The Industrial Charter: A Statement of Conservative Industrial Policy was a 1947 pamphlet and policy statement by the United Kingdom Conservative Party. The Charter is widely regarded as representing a seminal moment in the history of post war Conservatism as the party reconciled itself with many of the economic and social policies introduced by Clement Attlee's Labour government following the 1945 United Kingdom general election.

History 
The Charter was first published in May 1947. It was the outcome of a process of rethinking brought about by the Conservative's landslide defeat in the 1945 United Kingdom general election. This process had begun a year earlier when the party's newly extended Research Department began work on defining a policy that was both Conservative and progressive. The policy statement was accepted on 2 October 1947 at the Conservative's Annual Conference being held in Brighton.

Content 
The Industrial Charter was a collection of distinct economic policies and included a separate "Pledge to the Consumer", a "Woman's Charter" and a "Workers' Charter". It accepted the idea of a mixed economy, gave a commitment that the party would protect labour rights, stressed the need for fairness and opposed protectionism.

Its emphasis was, though, placed squarely upon the individual and the document was highly-critical of its opponents. The Labour Party's attempts at economic planning were criticised for having created an incompetent and swollen civil service focused on administering a multitude of overlapping and unnecessary restrictions. It argued that the party had removed economic incentives and enforced a 'rigid straight jacket of doctrinaire political theory…[and] unnecessary controls'. Instead it called for a rolling back of the state and urged that a 'sense of realism, free opportunity, incentives and justice' should 'inspire all industrial policy'.

Reception 
The Charter and a shortened 'popular' version were generally well received, sold an estimated 2.5 million copies and have often been thought to have helped "rehabilitate" the Conservative Party after 1945.<ref>Peter Dorey, British Conservatism and Trade Unionism, 1945-1964 (Farnham, 2009), p. 48.</ref> Despite this the document caused a notable degree of debate at the 1947 Conservative Party Conference and Winston Churchill's initial reaction is reputed to have been 'but I do not agree with a word of this'.

Despite its favourable press, the historian Andrew Taylor also contends that the Charter should be seen as a propaganda failure as it failed to reach its intended audience. This is backed up by a report conducted by Mass Observation which found that eighty per cent of a sample had no knowledge at all of the Charter in the month after its publication.

 Historical significance 
Although perhaps not as a pivotal a moment of the Conservative Party's history as often claimed, the Charter'' remains historically symbolic as marking the acceptance of the post-war consensus that would later be satirised as Butskellism. This owes much to the significance later imbued into the document by those responsible for its publication.

References

Additional Bibliography
 (Google Books)

 (Google Books)

Conservative Party (UK) publications
History of the Conservative Party (UK)
One-nation conservatism
1947 in the United Kingdom
Political manifestos
1947 in British politics
1947 documents
Pamphlets
Progressive conservatism